The State Theatre also known as the Kalamazoo State Theatre in Kalamazoo, Michigan was designed by renowned architect John Eberson and built by founder Colonel William Butterfield in 1927. The Kalamazoo State is one of the very few remaining atmospheric picture palaces still intact. It currently remains in operation today as the main performance hall for musicians, comedian, and other live entertainment in the Kalamazoo area. The theatre was listed on the National Register of Historic Places in 2021.

Nationwide context 
In the United States, the mid to late 1920s was a booming time for the film industry. With the growing power and vertical integration of major companies, between 1922 and 1930 the total investment in the film industry jumped from $78 million to $850 million. The average weekly attendance at American movie theatres doubled from 40 million in 1922 to 80 million in 1928. A key component to this growth was the creation of movie theatres. There was competition to provide a tremendous experience which led to the extravagant era of the Picture Palace. The term Picture Palace is used to describe the opulent style of theatre that seated thousands. The iconographic features of the exterior of the theatre were designed to make the front of the theatre a "show window" to invite customers to come see a performance. With fancy lobbies, uniformed ushers, musical accompaniments, and unique architecture these picture palaces were a unique draw that allowed a place where working and middle-class patrons could find luxury. Reflecting this national trend was Kalamazoo, a rising city during the twenties; due to the rapid increase in population it began to develop a need for a prominent theatre.

Early Years 
The Kalamazoo State Theatre was built as a mid-sized picture palace in 1927 for the W.S. Butterfield Theatre chain. The State was constructed in 9 months for $350,000. Initially it was home to vaudeville shows, dance recitals, and silent films. The Kalamazoo State is an atmospheric theatre, which was one of the two basic design styles: atmospheric and conventional, that picture palaces could be. Atmospheric meant that the palace gave the impression of sitting in an auditorium that opened to a night sky.

The theatre was designed by John Eberson, a renowned theatre architect out of Chicago, who was known for his style of atmospheric theatres. For the Kalamazoo State he employed a Spanish theme. Originally the State seated 1,300 people with the interior reflecting a beautiful Spanish courtyard. The ceiling is painted dark blue with twinkling electric stars, and moving clouds which are projected across it to create an outdoor atmosphere. The auditorium, lobby, and mezzanine are decorated in a Mediterranean color scheme with pottery, furniture, wrought iron, statues, and paintings. Outside they utilize buff-colored tapestry, brick, and ornate terra-cotta accents.

Barton Theatre Organ 
Silent films always had musical accompaniment. In the large picture palaces, such as those in Chicago and Detroit, they would typically have a live orchestra. The smaller palaces, such as the Kalamazoo State Theatre, would have had a chamber group or pipe organ. This was a great improvement from the small town and second run houses which would typically only offer a piano player.

The Kalamazoo State is home to a Barton Theatre Organ, which accompanied silent pictures from 1927 to 1937. Barton was one of the better-known companies along with: Wurlitzer, Kimball, and Morton. Theatre organs were a unique combination of multiple instruments and sound effects. These intriguing machines greatly varied in size and complexity ranging from two manuals and six ranks to four or five manuals and more than fifty or sixty ranks. With the advent of "talkies," it was silenced until 1950. However, in 1961 it was fully restored and put back into service. The original Barton Organ is still used for special presentations.

Survival 
In 1964, the theatre underwent drastic modernization. Due to age-induced damage, the original 45-foot vertical sign on the corner was replaced with a horizontal marquee over the box-office. The interior was stripped of some of its original decor.

In 1982, Butterfield decided to stop showing first-run movies at the State and it was closed that same year due to poor profits and the spreading popularity of the suburban movie multiplex. The closing of such a historic part of Kalamazoo began to mobilize community members. Efforts to save the theatre from a tragic end were pursued by several local entrepreneurs and preservationists. Local arts groups and city officials formed the "Save the State" committee in an effort to preserve the theatre's legacy along with the building.  The solution came when the building was purchased in 1985 by the Hinman Company. The purchase brought about further renovation and worked to preserve a part of Kalamazoo's history. Recent preservation efforts have helped to restore the original splendor of the State. After years of uncertainty, Kalamazoo's State Theatre has survived to attract a wide variety of performers. It is one of the few remaining atmospheric movie palaces in the United States.

State in the Twenty-First Century 
The Kalamazoo State Theatre is currently owned by the Hinman Company a real-estate development, management, and leasing company. They own property across the United States and have an especially large portfolio in the Kalamazoo area. The State currently is the premier live performance venue in Kalamazoo, hosting performances by the likes of Lewis Black, Kid Cudi, and other popular entertainers.

The Kalamazoo State Theatre is part of the League of Historic American Theatres (LHAT), an organization that champions the restoration, preservation and ongoing operations of North America's treasured venues.

See also 

 Movie palaces list
 Atmospheric theater
 John Eberson

References

External links 
 Kalamazoo State Theatre - Historic photo gallery
 Kalamazoo State Theatre - Current photo gallery

National Register of Historic Places in Kalamazoo County, Michigan
Theatres completed in 1927
Movie palaces
Atmospheric theatres
John Eberson buildings
Buildings and structures in Kalamazoo, Michigan
Music venues in Michigan